Clonmore is a hard cheese made from goat's milk, with a waxed rind.  It originates from Charleville, County Cork in Ireland  and is produced by Tom and Lena Biggane on their farm outside Newtownshandrum since 2001.

It is a gouda style cheese made with vegetarian rennet, covered in a beige waxed rind.  Both pasteurised and non-pasteurised (raw milk) versions are available. It has a mild and sweet flavour, which is stronger when aged. It is a seasonal cheese, produced from late March till early November.  The goats herd numbers between 70 and 80 of both Saanen and Toggenburg breeds, and are free range.

Awards
Clonmore has won numerous awards, including a gold medal at the National Farmhouse Cheese Competitions in 2003, a silver medal in the same competition in 2005, a gold medal in the British Cheese Awards in 2006, and a bronze medal in 2008.

See also
 List of goat milk cheeses

References

Goat's-milk cheeses
Irish cheeses